Hyde Park in London, England, has been an important venue for rock music concerts since the late 1960s. The music management company Blackhill Enterprises held the first rock concert there on 29 June 1968, attended by 15,000 people. On the bill were Pink Floyd, Roy Harper and Jethro Tull. The supergroup Blind Faith (featuring Eric Clapton and Steve Winwood) played their debut gig in Hyde Park on 7 June 1969. The Rolling Stones headlined a concert (later released as The Stones in the Park) on 5 July that year, two days after the death of founding member Brian Jones, and is now remembered as one of the most famous gigs of the 1960s. The early gigs from 1968–71 were free events, while later concerts were pay-to-enter.

The park has also played host to many music festivals, including Party in the Park between 1998 and 2004, The Wireless Festival between 2005 and 2012, Hard Rock Calling between 2006 and 2012, Radio 2 Live in Hyde Park since 2011 and Barclaycard presents British Summer Time since 2013.

1960s
1968 – Pink Floyd, Fleetwood Mac, Roy Harper, Jethro Tull, Tyrannosaurus Rex, The Nice, The Pretty Things, Ten Years After, Traffic, Family
1969 – Blind Faith, Alexis Korner, Donovan, Richie Havens, Al Stewart, Edgar Broughton Band, King Crimson, Third Ear Band, Soft Machine, The Rolling Stones, Quintessence, The Deviants

1970s
1970 – Canned Heat, Pink Floyd, Eric Burdon and War, John Sebastian, Kevin Ayers (And The Whole World), Stoneground
1971 – Grand Funk Railroad, Roy Harper, Steve Hillage, Humble Pie, King Crimson
1974 – Roy Harper w/ David Gilmour, Roger McGuinn, Kevin Ayers, Gong and Nico
1975 – Supercharge, Wigwam
1976 – Kiki Dee, Steve Hillage, Queen, Supercharge

1980s
1986 – Elvis Costello

1990s
1991 – Luciano Pavarotti - Pavarotti in the Park
1996 – The Prince's Trust Benefit Concert, Eric Clapton
1998 – The Corrs, Michael Flatley, Shania Twain
1999 – Bryan Adams, Sinéad O'Connor, Cliff Richard, Simply Red, Lisa Stansfield

2000s
2000 – Elton John, Bon Jovi, Kylie Minogue, Westlife, Ronan Keating, Christina Aguilera, The Corrs, Travis, Lionel Richie, Steps, Backstreet Boys
2001 – The Beach Boys, Jeff Beck, Elton John, Tom Jones, Status Quo, Sting, Supersister
2002 – Bryan Adams, Joseph Arthur, The Cure, The Cranes, Meat Loaf, Mogwai, Paul Weller
2003 – Bryan Adams, Bon Jovi, Busted, Live, Sinéad O'Connor, Shania Twain, Yes
2004 – The Everly Brothers, The Red Hot Chili Peppers, Simon & Garfunkel, Snow Patrol
2005 – Feeder, Idlewild, Live 8, Sinéad O'Connor, Queen + Paul Rodgers, R.E.M., Razorlight, Johnathan Rice, The Scissor Sisters, Simply Red, Patti Smith
2006 – Angels & Airwaves, The Who, Roger Waters w/ Nick Mason, Goldfrapp, Foo Fighters, Motörhead, Queens of the Stone Age
2007 – Aerosmith, Peter Gabriel, The White Stripes, Kaiser Chiefs, Daft Punk, Faithless
2008 – A Hawk and a Hacksaw, Eric Clapton, Jack Johnson, The Police, Morrissey, and The Nelson Mandela 90th Birthday Tribute Concert
2009 – Blur, The Counterfeit Stones and Florence + The Machine, Bruce Springsteen and the E Street Band, Neil Young

2010s
2010 – The Black Keys, Tom Jones, Paul McCartney, Kings of Leon, Patti Smith, The Whigs
2011 – Bon Jovi, Westlife, Arcade Fire, Kings of Leon, Mumford & Sons, The Musgraves, The Walkmen, Paul Weller and The Zac Brown Band
2012 – Blur, Soundgarden, Bruce Springsteen, Paul Simon, Madonna
2013 – The Rolling Stones, Bon Jovi, JLS, Lionel Richie, Ray Davies, Jennifer Lopez as part of Barclaycard presents British Summer Time
2014 – Electric Light Orchestra, The Libertines, Neil Young, Arcade Fire, McBusted, Tom Jones, Black Sabbath as part of Barclaycard presents British Summer Time
2015 – Blur, Kylie Minogue, The Strokes, Taylor Swift and The Who have been announced as the headliners of Barclaycard presents British Summer Time for June 2015.
2016 – Massive Attack, Florence + The Machine, Carole King, Mumford & Sons, Take That and Stevie Wonder have been announced as the headliners of Barclaycard presents British Summer Time for July 2016.
2016 – Carole King performed her breakthrough album Tapestry as part of British Summer Time The concert was later shown in movie theatres and on PBS and released as a live album.
2017 – Phil Collins, Green Day, Justin Bieber, Kings of Leon, The Killers and Tom Petty & The Heartbreakers have been announced as the headliners of Barclaycard presents British Summer Time for June/July 2017.
2018 – Roger Waters, The Cure, Eric Clapton, Michael Bublé, Bruno Mars, Paul Simon
2019 – Celine Dion, Pet Shop Boys, Bananarama, Westlife, Emeli Sande, Status Quo, Robbie Williams, Simply Red, Kelsea Ballerini, Clean Bandit

2020s

2022 

Elton John: 24 June 

Rolling Stones: 25 June and 3 July

Eagles: 26 June 

Adele: 1 and 2 July

References
Notes

Citations

External links
First Hyde Park concert – 28 September 1968

British music-related lists
 
Concerts in Hyde Park
Lists of concerts and performances by location
Lists of events by venue
Concerts in Hyde Park